Watts Branch is a tributary stream of the Potomac River in Montgomery County, Maryland.

Course

Portions of Watts Branch flow through a stream valley park, a mostly undeveloped natural area which acts as a riparian buffer zone to help minimize stream bank erosion and filter pollutants from stormwater runoff.

Development impacts on water quality
While some parts of the Watts Branch watershed are parkland or remain forested, the area is adjacent to Rockville town center and the Interstate 270 corridor. This community has experienced extensive residential and commercial development over the past several decades. Population in the Rockville city limits (of which only a portion is in the Watts Branch watershed) more than doubled between 1960 and 2010, from approximately 26,000 to 61,000. These development trends have led to degraded water quality due to stormwater pollution in some portions of the Watts Branch mainstem and tributaries. The stream and watershed have been the subject of extensive studies and planning by Montgomery County and the City of Rockville. A number of stream restoration projects have been undertaken by both governments.

In order to preserve water quality in a partially developed area, the county imposed some restrictions on development (i.e. designation of a "Special Protection Area") in part of the Piney Branch sub-watershed in 1994. Following intensive land development after 1998, county scientists found that the special restrictions had only a limited effect, and water quality declined where development had occurred.

Tributaries of Watts Branch
Major tributaries of Watts Branch include:
Research Boulevard Tributary
Valley Drive Tributary
Cold Spring Tributary
Fallsreach Tributary
Potomac Green Tributary
Kilgour Branch
Potomac View Branch
Piney Branch
Piney Glen Tributary
Greenbriar Branch
Sandy Branch

See also
List of Maryland rivers
Watts Branch (Anacostia River)

References

External links
 Watts Branch Watershed Assessment (2015) - City of Rockville

Rivers of Montgomery County, Maryland
Rivers of Maryland
Tributaries of the Potomac River